Margaret Ward (c. 1550-30 August 1588), the "pearl of Tyburn", was an English Catholic martyr who was executed during the reign of Elizabeth I for assisting a priest to escape from prison. She was canonised in 1970, as one of the Forty Martyrs of England and Wales.

Life

Margaret Ward was born in Congleton, Cheshire around 1550. She was living in London in the service of a lady of the "first rank" when she learned of the severe maltreatment of Richard Watson, a priest confined at Bridewell Prison. She obtained permission to visit him. She was thoroughly searched before and after every visit, but gradually the authorities became less cautious, and she managed to smuggle a rope into the prison. Fr. William Watson jumped off the wall, slightly hurting himself. He escaped, but left the rope hanging from the window. The boatman whom Ward had engaged to convey him down the river then refused to carry out the bargain. Ward, in her distress, confided in another boatman, John Roche, who undertook to assist her. He provided a boat and exchanged clothes with the priest. Watson escaped, but Roche was captured in his place, and Ward, having been Watson's only visitor, was also arrested.

Margaret Ward was kept in irons for eight days, was hung up by the hands, and scourged, but absolutely refused to disclose the priest's whereabouts. At her trial, she admitted to having helped Watson to escape, and rejoiced in "having delivered an innocent lamb from the hands of those bloody wolves". She was offered a pardon if she would attend a Protestant service but refused. She was hanged at Tyburn on 30 August 1588, along with Edward Shelley, Richard Martin, Richard Leigh, Richard Lloyd (alias Flower) and John Roche.

Veneration
Margaret Ward was beatified in 1929 and canonised by Pope Paul VI on 25 October 1970, as one of the Forty Martyrs of England and Wales. Her feast day, along with all the English Martyrs, is on 4 May. However, in the Roman Catholic dioceses of England, she shares a feast day with fellow female martyr saints Margaret Clitherow and Anne Line, on 30 August. The three were officially added to the Episcopal Church liturgical calendar with a feast day on 30 August.

Ward is depicted in panels in St Joseph's, Sale and St Alban's, Wallasey. There are several schools named after her, including St Margaret Ward Catholic Academy in Tunstall, Staffordshire.

References

1550s births
1588 deaths
People from Congleton
Canonizations by Pope Paul VI
English Roman Catholic saints
Forty Martyrs of England and Wales
People executed under Elizabeth I
Executed people from Cheshire
Executed English women
16th-century Christian saints
16th-century Roman Catholic martyrs
16th-century English women
People executed by the Kingdom of England by hanging
Christian female saints of the Early Modern era
Anglican saints